Luther Kaltenbach was a veteran of the American Civil War and a recipient of the Medal of Honor.

Biography 
Kaltenbach was born in Germany but immigrated to the United States at the age of one or two. Most of his childhood was taken up by helping work on his family's farm. He joined the 12th Iowa Infantry near the start of the Civil War in 1861.

On April 6, 1862, during the Battle of Shiloh, Kaltenbach was shot in the right hand. The injury gave him two crooked fingers that would continue to pain him throughout his life. Kaltenbach was captured by Confederate forces the same day he was injured. However, he returned to active service with his unit after being paroled by his Confederate captors.

Battle of Nashville 
During the Battle of Nashville Kaltenbach and the 12th Iowa Infantry attacked entrenched Confederate positions. On December 16, 1864, Kaltenbach participated in a final charge against several Confederate regiments. During the attack, the color bearer of the 44th Mississippi Infantry was incapacitated. Kaltenbach advanced ahead of his unit over Confederate barricades and captured the regiment's flag.

Two days after the battle, a special field order was given to allow Kaltenbach and sixteen other soldiers who had captured enemy flags during the Battle of Nashville and the Battle of Franklin to journey to Washington, D.C. While there, they presented flags they had captured from Confederate forces to Secretary of War Edwin M. Stanton. All of the soldiers were granted furlough for a month, pay, and the Medal of Honor for their actions.

Official Citation

Later life 
In 1868, Kaltenbach attempted to find a warmer climate to lessen the pain caused by the hand wound he received during the Battle of Shiloh. He moved to Colorado, then Utah, then California and lastly into Mexico. He moved to the state of Washington in 1878 following a stroke so he could be cared for by his brother. Several years later, he moved to Arizona where he worked as a Justice of the Peace. In 1892, Kaltenbach started to receive a disability pension of two dollars a month, and would later receive an extra ten dollars month for receiving the Medal of Honor. In 1903, he moved to California again. In 1905, Kaltenbach was granted a pension of twenty-four dollars a month by an Act of Congress. He married May Wardlow in 1907, but they divorced several years later. Kaltenbach died in 1922 after being hit by a car.

References 

1843 births
1922 deaths
People of Iowa in the American Civil War
German emigrants to the United States
American Civil War recipients of the Medal of Honor
Union Army soldiers
United States Army Medal of Honor recipients
German-born Medal of Honor recipients
People from Baden